Rock The Desert is a Christian music festival held in Midland, Texas, United States, every August.

Background
Rock the Desert began in August 1999 on the parking lot of Holy Trinity Episcopal Church in Midland, Texas. An idea birthed by Jeff Fouts, the associate Rector, to provide a free concert as a project to reach out to the church neighborhood has grown to become an area-wide event.

Since then the festival has been held at Beal Park and its current location on Farm-to-Market Road 1788. The 20th festival, headlined by Skillet was in 2019; as of July 2019 the organisers had agreed to take a break for the following year and had yet to make a decision on whether it would return for 2021.

References

Christian music festivals
Music festivals in Texas